Deeley is an Irish surname. Notable people with the surname include:

Andy Deeley, New Zealand international soccer player
Cat Deeley (born 1976), English television presenter and model
James Deeley (born 1871), English professional soccer player
Michael Deeley (born 1932), British film producer
Norman Deeley (1933–2007),  English professional soccer player
Patrick Deeley (born 1953), Irish poet 
Peter Deeley, British journalist
Richard Deeley (1855-1944), British engineer
Trevor Deeley, Motorcycle racer

See also
Mallaby-Deeley Baronets
Sir Harry Mallaby-Deeley, 1st Baronet (1863–1937), British politician
Anson & Deeley boxlock action
Deeley boppers
Mount Deeley, Antarctic mountain
Dealey (disambiguation)